The 1st Magritte Awards ceremony, presented by the Académie André Delvaux, honored the best films of 2010 in Belgium and took place on 5 February 2011 at the Square in the historic site of Mont des Arts, Brussels, beginning at 7:30 p.m. CET. During the ceremony, the Académie André Delvaux presented Magritte Awards in twenty categories. The ceremony, televised in Belgium by BeTV, was produced by José Bouquiaux and directed by Vincent J. Gustin. Film director Jaco Van Dormael presided the ceremony, while actress Helena Noguerra hosted the evening. The pre-show ceremony was hosted by film director Fabrice Du Welz.

Mr. Nobody won six awards, including Best Film and Best Director for Jaco Van Dormael. Other winners included Illegal, Private Lessons, and A Town Called Panic with two awards each, and The Barons, The Boat Race, Looking for Eric, Paths of Memory, Sleepless Night, and Soeur Sourire with one.

Background
In 2010, the Académie André Delvaux was established by Patrick Quinet, president of the Francophone Film Producers Association (UPFF), and Luc Jabon, president of Pro Spère, to unite the five branches of the film industry: actors, directors, producers, technicians and writers. It aims to recognize excellence in Belgian francophone cinematic achievements in order to have a Belgian counterpart of the French César Awards. Charly Herscovici, who created the Magritte Foundation, allowed the academy to use the name of the Belgian artist René Magritte.

Overseen by the Académie André Delvaux, the Magritte Awards replace the Joseph Plateau Awards, which were disestablished in 2007. During the first ceremony, 18 merit categories and two special awards were presented, honoring artists, directors and other personalities of the film industry for their works during the 2009–2010 period.

Winners and nominees
The nominees for the 1st Magritte Awards were announced on 13 January 2011 at the Square in Mont des Arts, Brussels, by Patrick Quinet and Luc Jabon, co-presidents of the Académie André Delvaux. Illegal received the most nominations with eight total, followed by Mr. Nobody and Private Lessons with seven each. The nominees for the Magritte Awards for Best Short Film and Best Documentary Film were announced on December 29, 2010.

The winners were announced during the awards ceremony on 5 February 2011. Mr. Nobody won six awards, the most for the ceremony: Best Film, Best Director and Best Screenplay for Jaco Van Dormael, Best Cinematography for Christophe Beaucarne, Best Original Score for Pierre Van Dormael, and Best Editing for Matyas Veress. Illegal and Private Lessons received two acting awards apiece. A Town Called Panic received two technical awards. On 25 January 2011 the Honorary Magritte Award was bestowed posthumously to André Delvaux.

Awards 

Winners are listed first and highlighted in boldface.

Honorary Magritte Award
 André Delvaux

Audience Award
 Benoît Poelvoorde

Films with multiple nominations and awards

The following 13 films received multiple nominations.
 Eight: Illegal
 Seven: Mr. Nobody and Private Lessons
 Six: The Barons
 Four: The Boat Race
 Three: My Queen Karo, Sister Smile, and A Town Called Panic
 Two: Altiplano, Amer, Angel at Sea, Le Concert, and Motherly

The following four films received multiple awards.
 Six: Mr. Nobody
 Two: Illegal, Private Lessons, and A Town Called Panic

See also

 36th César Awards
 16th Lumières Awards
 2010 in film

References

External links
 Official website
 
 1st Magritte Awards at AlloCiné

2011
2010 film awards
2011 in Belgium